30 Minutes is an American educational newsmagazine television program that aired on CBS on Saturdays from 1978 to 1982 following its Saturday-morning cartoon lineup. Patterned after 60 Minutes, its topics ranged from acne and rock bands to the Ku Klux Klan and juvenile defendants.

The show was hosted by Christopher Glenn, Betsy Aaron (1978-1980) and Betty Ann Bowser (1980-1981).

Guests
The program featured interviews with upcoming celebrities such as Stockard Channing, and music groups like The Police.

Producers
 Madeline Amgott, awarded three Daytime Emmys for her work on 30 Minutes
 Catherine Olian
 Martin Smith

References

External links
 

1978 American television series debuts
1982 American television series endings
1970s American children's television series
1980s American children's television series
1970s American television news shows
1980s American television news shows
American children's education television series
60 Minutes
CBS original programming
CBS News
Peabody Award-winning television programs
Television series by CBS Studios